The Lecythidaceae  comprise a family of about 20 genera and 250–300 species of woody plants native to tropical South America, Africa (including Madagascar), Asia and Australia.

The most important member of the family in world trade is the Brazil nut (Bertholletia excelsa), valued for its edible nuts; the paradise nut (Lecythis species) is also eaten.

Taxonomy 
According to the most recent molecular analysis of Lecythidaceae by Mori et al. (2007), the three subfamilies are:
Foetidioideae (Foetidiaceae) from Madagascar include only Foetidia.
Planchonioideae (including Barringtonia) are restricted to the Old World tropics.
Lecythidoideae (Lecythidaceae) are restricted to the New World tropics.

Two other families are sometimes included in Lecythidaceae; the Scytopetalaceae and Napoleonaeaceae are hypothesized as most closely related to Lecythidaceae.

The APG II system of 2003 includes genera from the family Scytopetalaceae in the Lecythidaceae, including Rhaptopetalum and Brazzeia.

Genera
The family Lecythidaceae includes the following genera:
 Abdulmajidia Whitmore, also as Barringtoniaceae sensu Takhtajan 1997 
 Allantoma Miers
 Asteranthos Desf., also as Asteranthaceae
 Barringtonia J.R.Forst. & G.Forst., also as Barringtoniaceae  
 Bertholletia Bonpl.
 Brazzeia Verc.
 Careya Roxb., also as Barringtoniaceae 
 Cariniana Casar.
 Chydenanthus Miers, also as Barringtoniaceae 
 Corythophora R.Knuth
 Couratari Aubl.
 Couroupita Aubl.
 Crateranthus Baker f., incertae sedis according to Takhtajan, perhaps Napoleonaeaceae
 Eschweilera Mart. ex DC.
 Foetidia Comm. ex Lam., also as Foetidiaceae 
 Grias L.
 Gustavia L.
 Lecythis Loefl.
 Napoleonaea P.Beauv., also as Napoleonaeaceae
 Petersianthus Merr., also as Barringtoniaceae 
 Pierrina Engl.
 Planchonia Blume, also as Barringtoniaceae 
 Rhaptopetalum Oliv.
 Scytopetalum Engl.

References

External links

Lecythidaceae in L. Watson and M.J. Dallwitz (1992 onwards). The families of flowering plants. http://delta-intkey.com
Barringtoniaceae in L. Watson and M.J. Dallwitz (1992 onwards). The families of flowering plants. http://delta-intkey.com
Foetidiaceae in L. Watson and M.J. Dallwitz (1992 onwards). The families of flowering plants. http://delta-intkey.com
Asteranthaceae in L. Watson and M.J. Dallwitz (1992 onwards). The families of flowering plants. http://delta-intkey.com
Napoleonaeaceae in L. Watson and M.J. Dallwitz (1992 onwards). The families of flowering plants. http://delta-intkey.com
The Lecythidaceae Pages by  Scott A. Mori and Ghillean T. Prance
Toa Alta, Puerto Rico
Lecythidaceae in BoDD – Botanical Dermatology Database
 Lecythidaceae Pages

 
Ericales families